Vijay Kumar Thakur is an Indian chemist, material scientist and Professor known for his research in the field of polymers, nanotechnology, manufacturing engineering, sustainable chemistry and materials science. He has published over 300 SCI journal articles, 52 Books and two USA patents. He sits on the editorial board of several SCI journals.

Early life
Born and brought up in district Bilaspur, Himachal Pradesh, India, Vijay received all his education from government educational institutes. He completed BSc; BEd and MSc in Organic Chemistry from Himachal Pradesh University, Shimla. He further went on to completed PhD in Organic Chemistry from National Institute of Technology, Hamirpur. He worked as a postdoctoral fellow at Iowa State University, USA.

Career and contributions 

His main area of focus is application oriented related to biomaterials, biorefining, polymers, nanocomposites, energy, functional materials, remediation, sensors, aerospace  as well as all aspects of sustainable, fields. Application aspects range across the automotive to aerospace, energy storage, water purification and biomedical fields to name a few.

Some of his other prior significant appointments include being a Research Scientist in Temasek Laboratories at Nanyang Technological University, Singapore (2009-2012) and a Visiting Research Fellow in the Department of Chemical and Materials Engineering at Lunghwa University of Science and Technology in Taiwan. He did his post-doctoral study in Materials Science and Engineering at Iowa State University and received a PhD in Polymer Chemistry (2009) at the National Institute of Technology.

Thakur is book series editor for "Materials Horizons: From Nature to Nanomaterials (Springer Nature); "Gels Horizons: From Science to Smart Materials" (Springer Nature); and Polymers and Fibers (Elsevier). Prior to commencing in the SRUC, Prof Thakur worked in the School of Aerospace, Transport and Manufacturing at Cranfield University, UK.  Prof Thakur has also worked as a Staff Scientist in the School of Mechanical and Materials Engineering at Washington State University, U.S.A.

In 2020, Thakur was ranked 154th in the list of the world's most cited scientists in the "Polymers" field that has been compiled by Scopus Database for Career Long Impact.

References 

Living people
Scientists from Himachal Pradesh
People from Bilaspur district, Himachal Pradesh
1981 births